Sandra J. Rosenthal (born 1966) is the Jack and Pamela Egan Professor of Chemistry, Professor of Physics and Astronomy, Pharmacology, Chemical and Biomolecular Engineering, and Materials Science at Vanderbilt University. She is a joint faculty member at Oak Ridge National Laboratory in the Materials Science and Technology Division and the Director of the Vanderbilt Institute of Nanoscale Science and Engineering.

Rosenthal is an acclaimed researcher in the field of nanoscience and nanomaterials. She has received national awards for her research endeavors and has also been actively engaged in STEM outreach programs which have benefitted students throughout the Middle Tennessee Region. Rosenthal's independent scientific career has been distinguished by her innovative studies on nanomaterials, most notably quantum dots and nanoclusters. She is the leader of a highly interdisciplinary research team based at Vanderbilt University which is focused on endeavors that span the fundamental study of quantum dots at the atomic scale to the development of designer nanomaterials for applications in diverse research areas spanning solid-state lighting to biological imaging. A major focus of Rosenthal's current research is "to develop and use nanotechnology to elucidate molecular mechanisms of mental illness".

Education, career, and service
Rosenthal received her B.S. with Honors in the field of Chemistry from Valparaiso University (1987). Rosenthal played 4 years of Division 1 basketball for Valparaiso University while receiving her undergraduate degree.

She went on to receive her Ph.D. in Chemistry from the University of Chicago with Graham Fleming where her thesis was on "Femtosecond solvent dynamics: observation of the inertial contribution to the solvent response" (1993).
From 1993–1995, Rosenthal was a National Science Foundation Postdoctoral Fellow at Lawrence Berkeley National Lab and UC Berkeley where she worked with Paul Alivisatos and Charles Shank. During her time as a postdoctoral fellow, Rosenthal began her involvement with spectroscopic studies on quantum dots. In 1996, Rosenthal began her independent faculty position on the Chemistry faculty at Vanderbilt University. Her independent research career has continued to be distinguished by her studies on quantum dots and nanomaterials.

At Vanderbilt University, Rosenthal is the Director of the Vanderbilt Institute of Nanoscale Science and Engineering and has served in that role for the past 12 years. During her tenure, the program has grown from 24 to 55 faculty members who have been awarded more than $250 million in funding for nanoscience research at the university. The efforts of the Institute have also served to benefit opportunities and access to education in the field nanoscience education at the level of both undergraduate and graduate studies at Vanderbilt. At her undergraduate alma mater Valparaiso University, Rosenthal serves as a member of the Valparaiso University College of Arts and Sciences National Council.

Awards
Charles Herty Medal, 2018
Valparaiso University Distinguished Alumni Award, Valparaiso University Alumni Association 2015
Faculty Achievement Award, Southeastern Conference Universities (SEC) 2014
Inaugural Jack & Pamela Egan Chair of Chemistry, Vanderbilt University, 2011
Fellow, American Association for the Advancement of Science, 2011
Jeffrey Nordhaus Award for Excellence in Undergraduate Teaching, 2009
Popular Mechanics Breakthrough Award, 2006
Distinguished Faculty Award, 2004
Madison-Sarrat Prize for Excellence in Undergraduate Teaching, 2004
NSF CAREER Award, 1999
NSF Postdoctoral Fellowship, 1993

Select publications
Prior to her independent research career:

Rosenthal's independent research career has been largely focused on the development of nanomaterials for applications in the energy sciences and the biosciences. She has also notably been one of the earliest advocates and leaders in support of utilizing (and extending capabilities) in electron microscopy for the purpose of advancing understanding of structure-function relationships relevant to the design of nanomaterials towards targeted technological applications. Some select publications from her research efforts are listed below:

References

Living people
Vanderbilt University faculty
Valparaiso University alumni
University of Chicago alumni
American chemists
American women chemists
American nanotechnologists
1966 births
American women academics